Salman Khodadadi (born 1962) is an Iranian politician.

Khodadadi was born in Malekan. He is a member of the 10th Islamic Consultative Assembly from the electorate of Malekan.

The charge of rape 
He is accused of sexual abuse of a girl called Zahra Navidpour, which eventually led to her suspicious suicide.

References

People from Malekan
Deputies of Malekan
Living people
1962 births
Members of the 10th Islamic Consultative Assembly
Members of the 8th Islamic Consultative Assembly
Members of the 7th Islamic Consultative Assembly
Members of the 6th Islamic Consultative Assembly
Members of the 5th Islamic Consultative Assembly
Islamic Revolutionary Guard Corps officers
People of the Ministry of Intelligence (Iran)